The 2008 United States presidential election in the District of Columbia took place on November 4, 2008, and was part of the 2008 United States presidential election. In D.C., voters chose three representatives, or electors to the Electoral College, who voted for president and vice president. Prior to the election, the nation's capital was considered to be a certain lock for Obama. Washington D.C. is fiercely Democratic and has voted for the Democratic candidate in every presidential election by large margins since 1964 when the District gained the right to electoral representation through the 23rd amendment.

The District of Columbia went to Democrat Barack Obama by a margin of 210,403 votes out of 225,224 votes cast, about 92% of the total vote. As of 2020, this remains the largest share of the popular vote ever won by any candidate in the District of Columbia since it was granted electoral votes in 1961. This was larger than John Kerry's in 2004, when he won the District with about 89% of the vote.

Primaries
 2008 District of Columbia Democratic primary
 2008 District of Columbia Republican primary

Predictions 
There were 16 news organizations who made state-by-state predictions of the election. Here are their last predictions before election day:

Results

Bob Barr was certified as a write-in in the District of Columbia, but votes for him weren't counted. Litigation is ongoing to have the votes counted.

By Ward
Each candidate's best result is shown in bold.

Electors

Technically the voters of D.C. cast their ballots for electors: representatives to the Electoral College. D.C. is allocated 3 electors. All candidates who appear on the ballot or qualify to receive write-in votes must submit a list of 3 electors, who pledge to vote for their candidate and his or her running mate. Whoever wins the majority of votes in the state is awarded all 3 electoral votes. Their chosen electors then vote for president and vice president. Although electors are pledged to their candidate and running mate, they are not obligated to vote for them. An elector who votes for someone other than his or her candidate is known as a faithless elector.

The electors of each state and the District of Columbia met on December 15, 2008, to cast their votes for president and vice president. The Electoral College itself never meets as one body. Instead the electors from each state and the District of Columbia met in their respective capitols.

The following were the members of the Electoral College from the state. All 3 were pledged to Barack Obama and Joe Biden:
Muriel Bowser
Jerry S. Cooper
Vincent C. Gray

See also
 United States presidential elections in the District of Columbia

References

United States Pres
District of Columbia
2008